Boris Leonidovich Giltburg  (born June 21, 1984) is an Israeli classical pianist, born in Russia.

Biography  
Giltburg was born into a Jewish family in Moscow, Russia, and began studying piano with his mother at the age of five. After emigrating to Israel, he studied with Arie Vardi between 1995 and 2007.

Music career
In 2002, Giltburg won 2nd prize (the top prize awarded) of the Paloma O'Shea Santander International Piano Competition in Spain, where he performed the Bartók Third Piano Concerto with the London Symphony Orchestra. Since then Giltburg has performed with the Philharmonia Orchestra, Royal Liverpool Philharmonic, Bournemouth Symphony, City of Birmingham Symphony Orchestra, Frankfurt Radio Symphony Orchestra, and the Israel Philharmonic with conductors such as Philippe Entremont, Christoph von Dohnányi, Mikhail Pletnev and Marin Alsop.

He won 2nd place at the 2011 Arthur Rubinstein International Piano Master Competition.

On 2 June 2013, he won the international piano competition Queen Elisabeth in Brussels.

References 

Israeli classical pianists
Jewish classical pianists
Russian emigrants to Israel
Prize-winners of the Queen Elisabeth Competition
Prize-winners of the Paloma O'Shea International Piano Competition
Living people
1984 births
21st-century classical pianists

External Links 
Boris Giltburg Official Website 
Boris Giltburg Discography 
Boris Giltburg's Beethoven 32 Sonatas Lecture Series